

Events

Pre-1600
 197 – Emperor Septimius Severus defeats usurper Clodius Albinus in the Battle of Lugdunum, the bloodiest battle between Roman armies.
 356 – The anti-paganism policy of Constantius II forbids the worship of pagan idols in the Roman Empire.
1594 – Having already been elected to the throne of the Polish–Lithuanian Commonwealth  in 1587, Sigismund III of the House of Vasa is crowned King of Sweden, having succeeded his father John III of Sweden in 1592.
1600 – The Peruvian stratovolcano Huaynaputina explodes in the most violent eruption in the recorded history of South America.

1601–1900
1649 – The Second Battle of Guararapes takes place, effectively ending Dutch colonization efforts in Brazil.
1674 – England and the Netherlands sign the Treaty of Westminster, ending the Third Anglo-Dutch War. A provision of the agreement transfers the Dutch colony of New Amsterdam to England.
1714 – Great Northern War: The battle of Napue between Sweden and Russia is fought in Isokyrö, Ostrobothnia.
1726 – The Supreme Privy Council is established in Russia.
1807 – Former Vice President of the United States Aaron Burr is arrested for treason in Wakefield, Alabama, and confined to Fort Stoddert.
1819 – British explorer William Smith discovers the South Shetland Islands and claims them in the name of King George III.
1836 – King William IV signs Letters Patent establishing the Province of South Australia.
1846 – In Austin, Texas, the newly formed Texas state government is officially installed. The Republic of Texas government officially transfers power to the State of Texas government following the annexation of Texas by the United States.
1847 – The first group of rescuers reaches the Donner Party.
1859 – Daniel E. Sickles, a New York Congressman, is acquitted of murder on grounds of temporary insanity. 
1878 – Thomas Edison patents the phonograph.
1884 – More than sixty tornadoes strike the Southern United States, one of the largest tornado outbreaks in U.S. history.

1901–present
1913 – Pedro Lascuráin becomes President of Mexico for 45 minutes; this is the shortest term to date of any person as president of any country.
1915 – World War I: The first naval attack on the Dardanelles begins when a strong Anglo-French task force bombards Ottoman artillery along the coast of Gallipoli.
1937 – Yekatit 12: During a public ceremony at the Viceregal Palace (the former Imperial residence) in Addis Ababa, Ethiopia, two Ethiopian nationalists of Eritrean origin attempt to kill viceroy Rodolfo Graziani with a number of grenades.
1942 – World War II: Nearly 250 Japanese warplanes attack the northern Australian city of Darwin, killing 243 people.
  1942   – World War II: United States President Franklin D. Roosevelt signs executive order 9066, allowing the United States military to relocate Japanese Americans to internment camps.
1943 – World War II: Battle of Kasserine Pass in Tunisia begins.
1945 – World War II: Battle of Iwo Jima: About 30,000 United States Marines land on the island of Iwo Jima.
1948 – The Conference of Youth and Students of Southeast Asia Fighting for Freedom and Independence convenes in Calcutta.
1949 – Ezra Pound is awarded the first Bollingen Prize in poetry by the Bollingen Foundation and Yale University.
1953 – Book censorship in the United States: The Georgia Literature Commission is established.
1954 – Transfer of Crimea: The Soviet Politburo of the Soviet Union orders the transfer of the Crimean Oblast from the Russian SFSR to the Ukrainian SSR.
1959 – The United Kingdom grants Cyprus independence, which is formally proclaimed on August 16, 1960.
1960 – China successfully launches the T-7, its first sounding rocket.
1963 – The publication of Betty Friedan's The Feminine Mystique reawakens the feminist movement in the United States as women's organizations and consciousness raising groups spread.
1965 – Colonel Phạm Ngọc Thảo of the Army of the Republic of Vietnam, and a communist spy of the North Vietnamese Viet Minh, along with Generals Lâm Văn Phát and Trần Thiện Khiêm, all Catholics, attempt a coup against the military junta of the Buddhist Nguyễn Khánh.
1976 – Executive Order 9066, which led to the relocation of Japanese Americans to internment camps, is rescinded by President Gerald Ford's Proclamation 4417.
1978 – Egyptian forces raid Larnaca International Airport in an attempt to intervene in a hijacking, without authorisation from the Republic of Cyprus authorities. The Cypriot National Guard and Police forces kill 15 Egyptian commandos and destroy the Egyptian C-130 transport plane in open combat.
1985 – William J. Schroeder becomes the first recipient of an artificial heart to leave the hospital.
  1985   – Iberia Airlines Boeing 727 crashes into Mount Oiz in Spain, killing 148.
1986 – Akkaraipattu massacre: the Sri Lankan Army massacres 80 Tamil farm workers in eastern Sri Lanka.
1989 – Flying Tiger Line flight 66 crashes into a hill near Sultan Abdul Aziz Shah Airport in Malaysia, killing four.
2002 – NASA's Mars Odyssey space probe begins to map the surface of Mars using its thermal emission imaging system.
2003 – An Ilyushin Il-76 military aircraft crashes near Kerman, Iran, killing 275.
2006 – A methane explosion in a coal mine near Nueva Rosita, Mexico, kills 65 miners.
2011 – The debut exhibition of the Belitung shipwreck, containing the largest collection of Tang dynasty artifacts found in one location, begins in Singapore.
2012 – Forty-four people are killed in a prison brawl in Apodaca, Nuevo León, Mexico.
2021 – Mya Thwe Thwe Khine, a 19-year-old protester, becomes the first known casualty of anti-coup protests that formed in response to the 2021 Myanmar coup d'état.

Births

Pre-1600
1461 – Domenico Grimani, Italian cardinal (d. 1523)
1473 – Nicolaus Copernicus, Prussian mathematician and astronomer (d. 1543)
1497 – Matthäus Schwarz, German fashion writer (d. 1574)
1519 – Froben Christoph of Zimmern, German author of the Zimmern Chronicle (d. 1566)
1526 – Carolus Clusius, Flemish botanist and academic (d. 1609)
1532 – Jean-Antoine de Baïf, French poet (d. 1589)
1552 – Melchior Klesl, Austrian cardinal (d. 1630)
1594 – Henry Frederick, Prince of Wales (d. 1612)

1601–1900
1611 – Andries de Graeff, Dutch politician (d. 1678)
1630 – Shivaji, Indian warrior-king and the founder of Maratha Empire
1660 – Friedrich Hoffmann, German physician and chemist (d. 1742)
1717 – David Garrick, English actor, playwright, and producer (d. 1779)
1743 – Luigi Boccherini, Italian cellist and composer (d. 1805)
1798 – Allan MacNab, Canadian soldier, lawyer, and politician, Premier of Canada West (d. 1862)
1800 – Émilie Gamelin, Canadian nun and social worker, founded the Sisters of Providence (d. 1851)
1804 – Carl von Rokitansky, German physician, pathologist, and philosopher  (d. 1878)
1821 – August Schleicher, German linguist and academic (d. 1868)
1833 – Élie Ducommun, Swiss journalist and activist, Nobel Prize laureate (d. 1906)
1838 – Lydia Thompson, British burlesque performer (d. 1908)
1841 – Elfrida Andrée, Swedish organist, composer, and conductor (d. 1929)
1855 – Nishinoumi Kajirō I, Japanese sumo wrestler, the 16th Yokozuna (d. 1908)
1859 – Svante Arrhenius, Swedish physicist and chemist, Nobel Prize laureate (d. 1927)
1865 – Sven Hedin, Swedish geographer and explorer (d. 1952)
1869 – Hovhannes Tumanyan, Armenian-Russian poet and author (d. 1923)
1872 – Johan Pitka, Estonian admiral (d. 1944)
1876 – Constantin Brâncuși, Romanian-French sculptor, painter, and photographer (d. 1957)
1877 – Gabriele Münter, German painter (d. 1962)
1878 – Harriet Bosse, Swedish–Norwegian actress (d. 1961)
1880 – Álvaro Obregón, Mexican general and politician, 39th President of Mexico (d. 1928)
1886 – José Abad Santos, Filipino lawyer and jurist, 5th Chief Justice of the Supreme Court of the Philippines (d. 1942)
1888 – José Eustasio Rivera, Colombian lawyer and poet (d. 1928)
1893 – Cedric Hardwicke, English actor and director (d. 1964)
1895 – Louis Calhern, American actor (d. 1956)
1896 – André Breton, French poet and author (d. 1966)
1897 – Alma Rubens, American actress (d. 1931)
1899 – Lucio Fontana, Argentinian-Italian painter and sculptor (d. 1968)

1901–present
1902 – Kay Boyle, American novelist, short story writer, and educator (d. 1992)
1904 – Havank, Dutch journalist and author (d. 1964)
1911 – Merle Oberon, Indian-American actress (d. 1979)
1912 – Dorothy Janis, American actress (d. 2010)
  1912   – Saul Chaplin, American composer (d. 1997)
1913 – Prince Pedro Gastão of Orléans-Braganza (d. 2007)
  1913   – Frank Tashlin, American animator and screenwriter (d. 1972)
1914 – Thelma Kench, New Zealand Olympic sprinter (d. 1985)
1915 – Dick Emery, English actor and comedian (d. 1983)
1915 – John Freeman, English lawyer, politician, and diplomat, British Ambassador to the United States (d. 2014)
1916 – Eddie Arcaro, American jockey and sportscaster (d. 1997)
1917 – Carson McCullers, American novelist, short story writer, playwright, and essayist (d. 1967)
1918 – Fay McKenzie, American actress (d. 2019)
1920 – C. Z. Guest, American actress, fashion designer, and author (d. 2003)
  1920   – Jaan Kross, Estonian author and poet (d. 2007)
  1920   – George Rose, English actor and singer (d. 1988)
1922 – Władysław Bartoszewski, Polish journalist and politician, Polish Minister of Foreign Affairs (d. 2015)
1924 – David Bronstein, Ukrainian chess player and theoretician (d. 2006)
  1924   – Lee Marvin, American actor (d. 1987)
1926 – György Kurtág, Hungarian composer and academic
1927 – Philippe Boiry, French journalist (d. 2014)
1929 – Jacques Deray, French director and screenwriter (d. 2003)
1930 – John Frankenheimer, American director and producer (d. 2002)
  1930   – K. Viswanath, Indian actor, director, and screenwriter (d. 2023)
1932 – Joseph P. Kerwin, American captain, physician, and astronaut
1935 – Dave Niehaus, American sportscaster (d. 2010)
  1935   – Russ Nixon, American MLB catcher and coach (d. 2016)
1936 – Sam Myers, American singer-songwriter (d. 2006)
  1936   – Frederick Seidel, American poet
1937 – Terry Carr, American author and educator (d. 1987)
  1937   – Norm O'Neill, Australian cricketer and sportscaster (d. 2008)
1938 – Choekyi Gyaltsen, 10th Panchen Lama (d. 1989)
1939 – Erin Pizzey, English activist and author, founded Refuge
1940 – Saparmurat Niyazov, Turkmen engineer and politician, 1st President of Turkmenistan (d. 2006)
  1940   – Smokey Robinson, American singer-songwriter and producer
  1940   – Bobby Rogers, American singer-songwriter (d. 2013)
1941 – David Gross, American physicist and academic, Nobel Prize laureate
  1941   – Jenny Tonge, Baroness Tonge, English politician
1942 – Cyrus Chothia, English biochemist and emeritus scientist at the Laboratory of Molecular Biology (d. 2019)
  1942   – Paul Krause, American football player and politician
  1942   – Howard Stringer, Welsh businessman
  1942   – Will Provine, American biologist, historian, and academic (d. 2015)
1943 – Lou Christie, American singer-songwriter
  1943   – Homer Hickam, American author and engineer
  1943   – Tim Hunt, English biochemist and academic, Nobel laureate
1944 – Les Hinton, English-American journalist and businessman
1945 – Yuri Antonov, Uzbek-Russian singer-songwriter
1946 – Paul Dean, Canadian guitarist 
  1946   – Peter Hudson, Australian footballer and coach
  1946   – Karen Silkwood, American technician and activist (d. 1974)
1947 – Jackie Curtis, American actress and playwright (d. 1985)
  1947   – Tim Shadbolt, New Zealand businessman and politician, 42nd Mayor of Invercargill
1948 – Mark Andes, American singer-songwriter and bass player 
  1948   – Pim Fortuyn, Dutch sociologist, academic, and politician (d. 2002)
  1948   – Tony Iommi, English guitarist and songwriter 
1949 – Danielle Bunten Berry, American game designer and programmer (d. 1998)
  1949   – Eddie Hardin, English singer-songwriter and pianist (d. 2015)
  1949   – Barry Lloyd, English footballer and manager
  1949   – William Messner-Loebs, American author and illustrator
1950 – Juice Leskinen, Finnish singer-songwriter (d. 2006)
  1950   – Andy Powell, English singer-songwriter and guitarist 
1951 – Muhammad Tahir-ul-Qadri, Pakistani scholar and politician, founder of Minhaj-ul-Quran
1952 – Ryū Murakami, Japanese novelist and filmmaker
  1952   – Rodolfo Neri Vela, Mexican engineer and astronaut
  1952   – Gary Seear, New Zealand rugby player (d. 2018) 
  1952   – Dave Cheadle, American baseball player (d. 2012)
  1952   – Amy Tan, American novelist, essayist, and short story writer
  1952   – Danilo Türk, Slovene academic and politician, 3rd President of Slovenia
1953 – Corrado Barazzutti, Italian tennis player
  1953   – Cristina Fernández de Kirchner, Argentine lawyer and politician, President of Argentina and Vice President of Argentina
  1953   – Massimo Troisi, Italian actor, director, and screenwriter (d. 1994)
1954 – Sócrates, Brazilian footballer and manager (d. 2011)
  1954   – Francis Buchholz, German bass player 
  1954   – Michael Gira, American singer-songwriter, guitarist, and producer 
1955 – Jeff Daniels, American actor and playwright
1956 – Kathleen Beller, American actress
  1956   – Peter Holsapple, American singer-songwriter and guitarist 
  1956   – Roderick MacKinnon, American biologist and academic, Nobel Prize laureate
  1956   – Dave Wakeling, English singer-songwriter and guitarist
1957 – Falco, Austrian singer-songwriter, rapper, and musician (d. 1998)
  1957   – Dave Stewart, American baseball player and coach
  1957   – Ray Winstone, English actor
1958 – Tommy Cairo, American wrestler
  1958   – Helen Fielding, English author and screenwriter
  1958   – Steve Nieve, English keyboard player and composer
1959 – Roger Goodell, American businessman
1960 – Prince Andrew, Duke of York
  1960   – John Paul Jr., American race car driver (d. 2020)
1961 – Justin Fashanu, English footballer (d. 1998)
  1961   – Ernie Gonzalez, American golfer (d. 2020)
1962 – Hana Mandlíková, Czech-Australian tennis player and coach
1963 – Seal, English singer-songwriter
  1963   – Jessica Tuck, American actress
1964 – Doug Aldrich, American singer-songwriter and guitarist
  1964   – Jennifer Doudna, American biochemist
  1964   – Jonathan Lethem, American novelist, essayist, and short story writer
1965 – Jon Fishman, American drummer 
  1965   – Clark Hunt, American businessman
  1965   – Leroy, American singer-songwriter, guitarist, and producer
1966 – Justine Bateman, American actress and producer
  1966   – Paul Haarhuis, Dutch tennis player and coach
  1966   – Eduardo Xol, American designer and author
1967 – Benicio del Toro, Puerto Rican-American actor, director, and producer
1968 – Frank Watkins, American bass player (d. 2015)
  1968   – Prince Markie Dee, American rapper and actor (d. 2021)
1969 – Burton C. Bell, American singer-songwriter and guitarist 
  1969   – Helena Guergis, Canadian businesswoman and politician
1970 – Joacim Cans, Swedish singer-songwriter 
1971 – Miguel Batista, Dominican baseball player and poet
  1971   – Richard Green, Australian golfer  
  1971   – Jeff Kinney, American author and illustrator
1972 – Francine Fournier, American wrestler and manager
 1972    – Sunset Thomas, American pornographic actress
1975 – Daniel Adair, Canadian drummer and producer 
  1975   – Daewon Song, South Korean-American skateboarder, co-founded Almost Skateboards
1976 – Beth Rigby, British political editor, Sky News
1977 – Ola Salo, Swedish singer-songwriter and keyboard player 
  1977   – Andrew Ross Sorkin, American journalist and author
  1977   – Gianluca Zambrotta, Italian footballer and manager
1978 – Ben Gummer, English scholar and politician
  1978   – Immortal Technique, Peruvian-American rapper
1979 – Steve Cherundolo, American soccer player and manager
1980 – Dwight Freeney, American football player
  1980   – Ma Lin, Chinese table tennis player
  1980   – Mike Miller, American basketball player
1981 – Beth Ditto, American singer
1983 – Kotoōshū Katsunori, Bulgarian sumo wrestler
  1983   – Mika Nakashima, Japanese singer and actress
  1983   – Reynhard Sinaga, Indonesian serial rapist
  1983   – Ryan Whitney, American ice hockey player
1984 – Chris Richardson, American singer-songwriter
1985 – Haylie Duff, American actress and singer
1986 – Kyle Chipchura, Canadian ice hockey player
  1986   – Marta, Brazilian footballer
  1986   – Maria Mena, Norwegian singer-songwriter
  1986   – Michael Schwimer, American baseball player
1987 – Anna Cappellini, Italian ice dancer
1988 – Shawn Matthias, Canadian ice hockey player 
  1988   – Seth Morrison, American guitarist
1989 – Sone Aluko, Anglo-Nigerian international footballer
1991 – Christoph Kramer, German national footballer
  1991   – Trevor Bayne, American race car driver
1992 – Camille Kostek, American model
1993 – Mauro Icardi, Argentinian footballer
  1993   – Victoria Justice, American actress and singer
1994 – Sam Lisone, New Zealand-Samoan rugby league player
  1994   – Tiina Trutsi, Estonian footballer
1995 – Nikola Jokić, Serbian basketball player
1996 – Mabel, British-Swedish singer
1998 – Katharina Gerlach, German tennis player
2001 – David Mazouz, American actor
  2001   – Lee Kang-in, South Korean footballer 
2004 – Millie Bobby Brown, English actress, model and producer

Deaths

Pre-1600
 197 – Clodius Albinus, Roman usurper (b. 150)
 446 – Leontius of Trier, Bishop of Trier
1133 – Irene Doukaina, Byzantine wife of Alexios I Komnenos (b. 1066)
1275 – Lal Shahbaz Qalandar, Sufi philosopher and poet (b. 1177)
1300 – Munio of Zamora, General of the Dominican Order
1408 – Thomas Bardolf, 5th Baron Bardolf, English rebel
1414 – Thomas Arundel, Archbishop of Canterbury (b. 1353)
1445 – Eleanor of Aragon, queen of Portugal (b. 1402)
1491 – Enno I, Count of East Frisia, German noble (b. 1460)
1553 – Erasmus Reinhold, German astronomer and mathematician (b. 1511)

1601–1900
1602 – Philippe Emmanuel, Duke of Mercœur (b. 1558)
1605 – Orazio Vecchi, Italian composer (b. 1550)
1622 – Henry Savile, English scholar and politician (b. 1549)
1672 – Charles Chauncy, English-American minister, theologian, and academic (b. 1592)
1709 – Tokugawa Tsunayoshi, Japanese shōgun (b. 1646)
1716 – Dorothe Engelbretsdatter, Norwegian author and poet (b. 1634)
1785 – Mary, Countess of Harold, English aristocrat and philanthropist (b. 1701)
1789 – Nicholas Van Dyke, American lawyer and politician, 7th Governor of Delaware (b. 1738)
1799 – Jean-Charles de Borda, French mathematician, physicist, and sailor (b. 1733)
1806 – Elizabeth Carter, English poet and translator (b. 1717)
1837 – Georg Büchner, German-Swiss poet and playwright (b. 1813)
  1837   – Thomas Burgess, English bishop and philosopher (b. 1756)
1887 – Multatuli, Dutch-German author and civil servant (b. 1820)
1897 – Karl Weierstrass, German mathematician and academic (b. 1815)

1901–present
1915 – Gopal Krishna Gokhale, Indian philosopher and politician (b. 1866)
1916 – Ernst Mach, Austrian-Czech physicist and philosopher (b. 1838)
1927 – Robert Fuchs, Austrian composer and educator (b. 1847)
1928 – George Howard Earle Jr., American lawyer and businessman (b. 1856)
1936 – Billy Mitchell, American general and pilot (b. 1879)
1945 – John Basilone, American sergeant, Medal of Honor recipient (b. 1916)
1951 – André Gide, French novelist, essayist, and dramatist, Nobel Prize laureate  (b. 1869)
1952 – Knut Hamsun, Norwegian novelist, poet, and playwright, Nobel Prize laureate (b. 1859)
1953 – Richard Rushall, British businessman (b. 1864)
1957 – Maurice Garin, Italian-French cyclist (b. 1871)
1959 – Willard Miller, American sailor, Medal of Honor recipient (b. 1877)
1962 – Georgios Papanikolaou, Greek-American pathologist, invented the Pap smear (b. 1883)
1969 – Madge Blake, American actress (b. 1899)
1970 – Ralph Edward Flanders, US Senator from Vermont (b. 1890) 
1972 – John Grierson, Scottish director and producer (b. 1898)
  1972   – Lee Morgan, American trumpet player and composer (b. 1938)
1973 – Joseph Szigeti, Hungarian violinist (b. 1892)
1977 – Anthony Crosland, English captain and politician, Secretary of State for Foreign and Commonwealth Affairs (b. 1918)
  1977   – Mike González, Cuban baseball player, coach, and manager (b. 1890)
1980 – Bon Scott, Scottish-Australian singer-songwriter (b. 1946)
1983 – Alice White, American actress (b. 1904)
1988 – André Frédéric Cournand, French-American physician and physiologist, Nobel Prize laureate (b. 1895)
1992 – Tojo Yamamoto, American wrestler and manager (b. 1927)
1994 – Derek Jarman, English director and set designer (b. 1942)
1996 – Charlie Finley, American businessman (b. 1918)
1997 – Leo Rosten, Polish-American author and academic (b. 1908)
  1997   – Deng Xiaoping, Chinese politician, 1st Vice Premier of the People's Republic of China (b. 1904)
1998 – Grandpa Jones, American singer-songwriter and banjo player (b. 1913)
1999 – Mohammad Mohammad Sadeq al-Sadr, Iraqi cleric (b. 1943)
2000 – Friedensreich Hundertwasser, Austrian-New Zealand painter and illustrator (b. 1928)
2001 – Stanley Kramer, American director and producer (b. 1913)
  2001   – Charles Trenet, French singer-songwriter (b. 1913)
2002 – Sylvia Rivera, American transgender LGBT activist (b. 1951)
2003 – Johnny Paycheck, American singer-songwriter and guitarist (b. 1938)
2007 – Janet Blair, American actress and singer (b. 1921)
  2007   – Celia Franca, English-Canadian dancer and director, founded the National Ballet of Canada (b. 1921)
2008 – Yegor Letov, Russian singer-songwriter (b. 1964)
  2008   – Lydia Shum, Chinese-Hong Kong actress and singer (b. 1945)
2009 – Kelly Groucutt, English singer and bass player  (b. 1945)
2011 – Ollie Matson, American sprinter and football player (b. 1930)
2012 – Ruth Barcan Marcus, American philosopher and logician (b. 1921)
  2012   – Jaroslav Velinský, Czech author and songwriter (b. 1932)
  2012   – Vitaly Vorotnikov, Russian politician, 27th Prime Minister of Russia (b. 1926)
2013 – Armen Alchian, American economist and academic (b. 1914)
  2013   – Park Chul-soo, South Korean director, producer, and screenwriter (b. 1948)
  2013   – Robert Coleman Richardson, American physicist and academic, Nobel Prize laureate (b. 1937)
  2013   – Donald Richie, American-Japanese author and critic (b. 1924)
  2013   – Eugene Whelan, Canadian farmer and politician, 22nd Canadian Minister of Agriculture (b. 1924)
2014 – Kresten Bjerre, Danish footballer and manager (b. 1946)
  2014   – Dale Gardner, American captain and astronaut (b. 1948)
  2014   – Valeri Kubasov, Russian engineer and astronaut (b. 1935)
2015 – Harold Johnson, American boxer (b. 1928)
  2015   – Nirad Mohapatra, Indian director, producer, and screenwriter (b. 1947)
  2015   – Harris Wittels, American actor, producer, and screenwriter (b. 1984)
2016 – Umberto Eco, Italian novelist, literary critic, and philosopher (b. 1932)
  2016   – Harper Lee, American author (b. 1926)
  2016   – Chiaki Morosawa, Japanese anime screenwriter (b. 1959)
  2016   – Samuel Willenberg, Polish-Israeli sculptor and painter (b. 1923)
2017 – Larry Coryell, American jazz guitarist (b. 1943)
2019 – Clark Dimond, American musician and author (b. 1941)
  2019   – Karl Lagerfeld, German fashion designer (b. 1933)
2020 – José Mojica Marins, Brazilian filmmaker, actor, composer, screenwriter, and television horror host (b. 1936)
  2020   – Pop Smoke, American rapper (b. 1999)

Holidays and observances
Armed Forces Day (Mexico)
Brâncuși Day (Romania)
Christian feast day:
Barbatus of Benevento
Boniface of Brussels
Conrad of Piacenza
Lucy Yi Zhenmei (one of Martyrs of Guizhou)
February 19 (Eastern Orthodox liturgics)
Commemoration of Vasil Levski (Bulgaria)
Flag Day (Turkmenistan)
Shivaji Jayanti (Maharashtra, India)

References

External links

 BBC: On This Day
 
 Historical Events on February 19

Days of the year
February
Discordian holidays